Pamela M. Kilmartin is a New Zealand astronomer and a co-discoverer of minor planets and comets.

She is credited by the Minor Planet Center with the discovery of 41 asteroids, all in collaboration with her husband, the astronomer Alan C. Gilmore. Both astronomers are also active comet-hunters. She is a Fellow of the Royal Astronomical Society of New Zealand (RASNZ) and co-director of its "Comets and Minor Planets" section.

The minor planet 3907 Kilmartin, discovered by Max Wolf in 1904, was named in her honour. Naming citation was published on 21 April 1989. In 1983, the Eunomia asteroid 2537 Gilmore was already named after both, Alan and Pamela Gilmore.

In May 2019 Kilmartin and her husband were honored by New Zealand Post with a stamp in its New Zealand Space Pioneers series.

List of discovered minor planets

References 
 

20th-century New Zealand astronomers
Discoverers of asteroids
Discoverers of comets

Living people
21st-century New Zealand astronomers
Women astronomers
Year of birth missing (living people)